Maaike De Vreese (born 26 July 1984 in Bruges) is a Belgian politician and civil servant active for the N-VA in the Flemish Parliament and the Belgian Senate.

Biography
De Vreese holds a degree in criminology from Ghent University. In 2008 she started working at the Belgian Federal Public Service Immigration Affairs. In the 2019 Belgian regional elections, De Vreese was elected from second place as a Flemish Member of Parliament on the list of the N-VA in the Constituency of West Flanders with 14,810 preference votes. To take up this mandate, she took political leave as a civil servant. She was also sent to the Senate as a state senator.

Notes

1984 births
Living people
Politicians from Bruges
New Flemish Alliance politicians
Members of the Flemish Parliament
Members of the Senate (Belgium)
21st-century Belgian politicians
Ghent University alumni